Gimeno is a surname. Notable people with the surname include:

Álvar Gimeno (born 1997), Spanish professional rugby union footballer 
Amalio Gimeno, 1st Count of Gimeno (1852–1936), Spanish nobleman, physician, scientist and politician
Andrés Gimeno (born 1937), Spanish tennis player
Beatriz Gimeno (born 1962), Spanish politician and LGBT rights activist
Daniel Gimeno Traver (born 1985), Spanish tennis player
Dimas Gimeno, Spanish businessperson and lawyer
Enrique Gimeno (1929-2007), Spanish-Mexican conductor, music professor, composer, pianist, manager of festivals
Gustavo Gimeno (born 1976), Spanish conductor
Jorge Gimeno (born 1990), Spanish triple jumper
Luis Gimeno (1927–2017), Uruguayan-born Mexican actor
Mario Gimeno (born 1969), Spanish footballer